Carlos María Gutiérrez (1926-1991) was a Uruguayan writer, journalist and caricaturist. He was a notable contributor at Prensa Latina.

He was married to Lebanese-Uruguayan actress Dahd Sfeir.

Selected works 
 En la Sierra Maestra y otros reportajes, journalism (Tauro, 1967)
 ¿Integración latinoamericana?: de la Alianza para el Progreso a la OLAS, journalism (Cruz del Sur, 1967) with Marcos Gabay
 El agujero en la pared, humor (Arca, 1968) with illustrations by himself, signature «Gut»
 Diario del cuartel, poetry (Casa de las Américas, collection Los Premios, La Habana, 1970)
 El experimento dominicano, journalism (USA, 1972 - Mexico, 1974)
 Reportaje a Perón, journalism (Schapire Editor, Buenos Aires, 1974)
 Ernesto Che Guevara, journalism (unpublished, compilation by CEAL 1970-1971)
 Incluido afuera, poetry (Arca, 1988)
 Los ejércitos inciertos y otros relatos, short stories (Arca, 1991; Ediciones de la Banda Oriental, 2002)

References

External links

Carlos María Gutiérrez at Anáforas (Biblioteca digital de autores uruguayos).

1926 births
1991 deaths
Uruguayan journalists